KYNR (1490 AM, "Voice of the Yakama Nation") is a radio station broadcasting a variety music format. Licensed to Toppenish, Washington, United States, the station is currently owned by Confederated Tribes and Bands of the Yakama Nation and features programming from National Public Radio and Native Voice One.

References

External links
 

Native American radio
YNR
Yakima County, Washington
Yakama